Leonid Husak (born 7 July 1987) is a Ukrainian footballer playing with FC Vorkuta in the Canadian Soccer League.

Playing career 
Husak began his football career as a product of the FC Chornomorets Odesa academy. In 2002, he advanced to play with FC Chornomorets-2 Odesa in the Ukrainian Second League. In 2005, he played with Dniester Ovdiopol, and played with the club for three seasons. In 2012, he signed with FC SKA Odesa in the Ukrainian Amateur Football League, and assisted in securing promotion to the Ukrainian Second League for the 2012–13 season. 

In 2017, he played abroad in the Canadian Soccer League with FC Vorkuta. In his debut season with Vorkuta he assisted in securing the First Division title. In 2021, he assisted in securing Vorkuta's third regular season title.

References 
 

1987 births
Living people
Ukrainian footballers
FC Chornomorets-2 Odesa players
FC Dnister Ovidiopol players
FC Continentals players
Canadian Soccer League (1998–present) players
Ukrainian Second League players
Footballers from Odesa
Association football defenders